The Counties of Denmark were former subdivisions of metropolitan Denmark and overseas territories, used primarily for administrative regions, with each county having its own council with substantial powers. Originally there had been twenty-four counties, but the number was reduced to roughly fourteen in 1970 – the number fluctuated slightly over the next three decades. In 2006 there were thirteen traditional counties as well as three municipalities with county status (the island of Bornholm, which was a county from 1660 until 2002, became a regional municipality with county powers, but only briefly from 2003 until 2006). On 1 January 2007 the counties were abolished and replaced by five larger regions which, unlike the counties, are not municipalities.

Copenhagen County comprised all the municipalities of Metropolitan Copenhagen, except Copenhagen Municipality and Frederiksberg Municipality which, on account of their peculiarity of being outside any of the traditional counties, had the equivalent of "county status". On 1 January 2007 these two municipalities lost their special status.

Greenland and the Faroe Islands are also part of the Danish Realm, but both enjoy internal autonomy. Both are largely self-governing, and each community sends two members to the Danish Parliament. The Faroe Islands obtained self-government in 1948; from 1816 to 1948 the islands had the status of a Danish county. Greenland changed from a colony to an overseas county in 1953.

Abolition
A government proposal in 2004 called for the counties to be abolished and replaced by five large regions with health care as their main responsibilities: two regions in Jutland, two regions in Zealand and one region covering Funen and the southernmost part of Jutland. The proposal also required the municipalities to merge reducing them from 271 to 98, with a minimum of 20,000 inhabitants in each municipality, although some exceptions were made to this rule. In 2007, 25 municipalities had fewer than 30,000 inhabitants each, with the average number of inhabitants over 55,500 per municipality. Only the United Kingdom and Ireland have more populous entities at the lowest political administrative level. 

The reform was confirmed by the Danish Parliament on 24 February 2005 and the counties were abolished on 1 January 2007.

List of counties (1970–2006)

The counties and county-level municipalities are listed below.

Ringkjøbing County used an old spelling of its name, while its capital city and state authorities used the modern Danish spelling, Ringkøbing.

The archipelago Ertholmene, located northeast of Bornholm, have never been a part of a municipality, county, or (from 2007) region. Statistics Denmark calls them Christiansø and Frederiksø, named after the two inhabited islets. They are included in numbers for Denmark (92 inhabitants; 0.39 square kilometers). The land area of Denmark is 42394 square kilometers.

See also 
 ISO 3166-2:DK
 NUTS:DK
 Administrative divisions of Greenland
 List of municipalities of Denmark (1970-2006)

References

External links 
 Statistics Denmark 
 Map of Denmark
 Explanation of Municipal Reform
 Map with named (new) municipalities
 Map of Faroe Islands
 Map of Greenland

 
Former subdivisions of Denmark
Denmark
Lists of populated places in Denmark

de:Verwaltungsgliederung Dänemarks
lt:Danijos administracinis suskirstymas
pt:Subdivisões da Dinamarca